The Chinese Medical Doctor Association (CDMA) is a non-profit organization founded in 2002. This organization is recognized by the Ministry of Civil Affairs of the People's Republic of China as a primary level national association. CDMA is organized under the Medical Practitioners Act 1999. It has been being developed as the largest and most influential medical association in China for now since it started. Under this organization there are 26 local associations, 39 specialty sub-association, five special committees and 18 medical publications.

See also
Medicine in China

References

External links
 CMDA Official Website

Medical associations based in China
Organizations established in 2002
2002 establishments in China